Bhabua Road (IRCTC code BBU) is a railway station on the Grand Chord line on the outskirts of Mohania,  from Bhabua in the Indian state of Bihar. It is also on the route of the Grand Trunk Road. It has five platforms. It is a B Grade station in Kaimur district recognised by Railway of India. As of 2012, over 50 trains from various starting stations pass through the station daily.

A new railway line from Bhabua Road to Ara Junction and Bhabua Road to Maa Mundeshwari Dham (via Bhabua City) is under construction. Bhabua Road is to be set up as a junction.

Station details
The station is the only major one in the district and lies on the Howrah–New Delhi Grand Chord in the Mughalsarai region. Its station code is "BBU".

Train details

Source: yatra.com

References

Sources

External links
 Map at India Rail Info
 Departure list at India Rail Info

Railway stations in Kaimur district
Mughalsarai railway division